The Hypodermatinae are a subfamily of Oestridae. The Hypodermatinae include large parasitic flies, some of which are known as warble flies. The 9 genera in this subfamily typically spend their larval stages in the skin or soft tissues of mammals, including bovines. Such species include serious pests of livestock.

Genera
Hypodermatinae includes 9 genera:
 Hypoderma
 Ochotonia
 Oestroderma
 Oestromyia
 Pallasiomyia
 Pavlovskiata
 Portschinskia
 Przhevalskiana
 Strobiloestrus

References 

Oestridae
Parasitic flies
Brachycera subfamilies